Frea sparsa is a species of beetle in the family Cerambycidae. It was described by Johann Christoph Friedrich Klug in 1833. It is known from Madagascar. It contains the variety Frea sparsa var. vagepicta.

References

sparsa
Beetles described in 1833